is a Japanese footballer currently playing as a midfielder for Fujieda MYFC.

Career statistics

Club
.

Notes

References

External links

1997 births
Living people
Hokuriku University alumni
Japanese footballers
Association football midfielders
J3 League players
Fujieda MYFC players